The 1983–84 Iowa State Cyclones men's basketball team represented Iowa State University during the 1983–84 NCAA Division I men's basketball season. The Cyclones were coached by Johnny Orr, who was in his 4th season. They played their home games at Hilton Coliseum in Ames, Iowa.

They finished the season 16–13, 6–8 in Big Eight play to finish in a tie for fourth place. The Cyclones lost in the first round of the Big Eight tournament  against Colorado, falling 65-62. They qualified for the NIT tournament, falling in the first round to Marquette, 73-53.

Roster

Schedule and results 

|-
!colspan=6 style=""|Exhibition

|-
!colspan=6 style=""|Regular Season

|-
!colspan=6 style=""|Big Eight tournament

|-
!colspan=6 style=""|NIT Tournament

|-

References 

Iowa State Cyclones men's basketball seasons
Iowa State
Iowa State Cyc
Iowa State Cyc